Andul is a census town in Sankrail CD Block of Howrah Sadar subdivision in Howrah district in the Indian state of West Bengal. It is a part of Kolkata Urban Agglomeration.

Geography

Area of Andul is 17.98 km².
It is situated between Mourigram and Argari.

Demographics
As per 2011 Census of India Andul had a total population of 6,302 of which 3,182 (50%) were males and 3,120 (50%) were females. Population below 6 years was 397. The total number of literates in Andul was 5,626 (95.28% of the population over 6 years).

Andul was part of Kolkata Urban Agglomeration in 2011 census.

 India census, Andul had a population of 5677. Males constitute 51% of the population and females 49%. Andul has an average literacy rate of 87%, higher than the national average of 59.5%; with 53% of the males and 47% of females literate. 6% of the population is under 6 years of age.

Economy

"Kamal Nursery" and "The Indian Nursery" two of the most famous names in the Indian horticulture industry are situated at Mahiari, Andul. Howrah Flower Growers' Association organize flower exhibition at Kamal Nursery every year. Manufacturing and fabrication of wooden furniture forms livelihood of a large number of population. This particular handcraft is popular throughout the district and the fame has reached outside the state also. Most of the population is associated with different service based industry like finance, education, Information Technology and Software. Modern days has seen rapid industrial growth in the outskirts of the village as it is closely associated with nearby Jangalpur and Dhulagori industrial estates.

Places to visit 

 Andul Royal Palace (or, Andul Rajbari).
 Jhorehat Harisabha Griha.
 Annapurna Temple.
 Dutta Chowdhury family Durga mandap
 Kashiswara Jiu temple.
 Madhaveshwar temple.
 Sankari Temple (or, Shiddeshwari Kali Temple).
 Sadhak Bhairavi's Cave.
 Premikh Bhawan (Majher bari).
 Kundu Chowdhury House (or, Kundu Bari), Mahiari.
 Panchananda Temple, Mahiari.
 Rasa-Mancha, Mahiari.
 Mahiari Public Library. 
 Khetropaul Baba Ashram, Mashila. 
 Ganges River Side, Basudevpur.
 Panchannan Temple, Puillya

Educational Institutes 

 New Andul Higher class school.
 Kishalaya KG school
 Shatadal Institution
 Ranibala High school, Mahiary.
 Mohiary Kundu Chowdhury Institution.
 Mohiary High school
 Prabhu Jagatbandhu College.
 Gramahitakai girls high school
 Holy Kids English Medium School
 Shyamsundar Prathomik Vidyalaya

Transport

Andul Road (part of Grand Trunk Road/State Highway 6) is the artery of the town.

Bus

Private Bus
 61 Alampur - Howrah Station

Mini Bus
 13 Ranihati - Rajabazar
 13A Fatikgachi - Rajabazar
 20 Alampur - Ultadanga Station

Bus Routes Without Numbers
 Mourigram railway station - Barrackpur Cantonment
 Andul railway station - New Town Ecospace

Train
Andul railway station and Mourigram railway station on Howrah-Kharagpur line are the nearest railway stations.

References

External links
WestBengal Help Center
Andulmouri.com

Cities and towns in Howrah district
Neighbourhoods in Kolkata
Kolkata Metropolitan Area